The Archivo Histórico Provincial de Granada is the historical archives for the Spanish Province of Granada.

External links
Official website (in Spanish)

Archives in Spain